Hans Karl von Guretzky-Cornitz (1855–1917) was a German army general of the First World War.  He was commander of the 9th Reserve Division during the early part of the war.  He is noted for an incident during the 1916 Battle of Verdun when he falsely reported capturing Fort Vaux and was awarded the Pour le Mérite.

Biography 
Guretzky-Cornitz was born in 1855.  By 1904 he was a colonel and chief of staff of the IX Army Corps.

During the early part of the First World War Guretzky-Cornitz commanded the 9th Reserve Division.  The division took part in the Battle of Verdun in 1916 and seized the village of Vaux-devant-Damloup from French troops in early March.  On 9 March Guretzky-Cornitz received reports that his troops had captured the key French fortification of Fort Vaux.  It was believed that the French had abandoned the post as they did earlier at  Fort Douaumont.  The report had come from a forward infantry officer.  The brigade commander raised doubts but apparent confirmation came from an artillery observer who reported seeing a German flag on the fort glacis and other observers reported sighting German troops at the fort with piled arms.  The brigade artillery commander noted that this was unlikely but was ordered to cease firing on the fort immediately.

Guretzky-Cornitz sent a self-aggrandising report to the 5th Army headquarters, from which it was sent onwards without verification. The capture of Fort Vaux was notified to the world's press as a major victory.  German Emperor Wilhelm II authorised the award of the Pour le Mérite to Guretzky-Cornitz for the success.  Because of the importance of the victory 5th Army commander Crown Prince Wilhelm took the unusual step of driving immediately to Guretzky-Cornitz's headquarters to award the medal on 9 March.

A column of troops sent by Guretzky-Cornitz to occupy Fort Vaux found the defenders were still present. They were machine gunned as they marched over the glacis and suffered heavy casualties.  The repulse was featured in French propaganda.  A new German press release was made stating that following a French counter-attack they had taken a foothold in the fort once more. Despite the misleading report Guretzky-Cornitz was permitted to retain his decoration. He died in 1917.

References

Bibliography 
 

1855 births
1917 deaths
German Army generals of World War I
Recipients of the Pour le Mérite (military class)